Heritage Park Mall is located on the northwest corner of Reno and Air Depot Rd. The property sits on about 39 acres and was the only shopping mall in Midwest City.

History
Heritage Park Mall first opened in fall 1978 With Dillard's, Montgomery Ward, Sears and H. J. Wilson Co. as anchors. The opening day celebrations included appearances by Billy Carter, Ed McMahon of The Tonight Show, soccer star Kyle Rote Jr. and Olympic runner Jim Ryun. In 1999, Montgomery Ward and the Service Merchandise that moved into the former Wilson's location closed. In March 2006, Dillard's closed their location at the mall, leaving Sears as the last anchor left. LifeChurch purchased the 102,000 square foot Dillard's for a discontinued $1.5 million in 2007 making it the sixth Oklahoma City area campus. After being for sale since May 2009, the owner of Heritage Park Mall announced the property would close February 15, 2010, leaving a handful of stores to close. The Mall's owner Daniel Rafalian purchased the mall for $7.2 million in 2005, but was asking $3.75 million. At the time, the mall accounted for 51% of retail vacancy in east Oklahoma County. In July 2011, the 232,000 square foot inline section of the mall sold to Ahmad Bahreini for a discounted $1.3 million. In summer 2017, it was announced that Sears would close its location, leaving LifeChurch as the sole anchor. The store closed in October.

References 

Shopping malls established in 1978
Midwest City, Oklahoma
1978 establishments in Oklahoma
Shopping malls in Oklahoma
Buildings and structures completed in 1978
Defunct shopping malls in the United States
Buildings and structures in Oklahoma City